Belinda Bencic defeated Daria Kasatkina in the final, 6–0, 6–2 to win the women's singles tennis title at the 2023 Adelaide International 2.

Madison Keys was the reigning champion from 2022, when the event was a WTA 250 tournament, but withdrew after competing at the United Cup.

For the first time since the 2017 Bank of the West Classic, all seeded players reached the quarterfinals.

Seeds 
The top two seeds who did not withdraw received a bye into the second round.

Draw

Finals

Top half

Bottom half

Qualifying

Seeds

Qualifiers

Lucky losers

Qualifying draw

First qualifier

Second qualifier

Third qualifier

Fourth qualifier

Fifth qualifier

Sixth qualifier

References

External links 
 Main draw
 Qualifying draw

Adelaide International 2
Adelaide International (tennis)
Adelaide